Rio Sex Comedy is a 2010 comedy film, written and directed by Jonathan Nossiter and starring Charlotte Rampling, and Bill Pullman, and Irène Jacob. It premiered at the 2010 Toronto International Film Festival on 16 September.

Plot
Rio de Janeiro is the destination of choice for the misadventures of several expatriates, seeking both personal pleasure and social justice. The eccentric grouping includes a plastic surgeon, an unconventional new U.S. ambassador to Brazil and a filmmaking French couple.

Cast
 Charlotte Rampling as Charlotte
 Bill Pullman as William
 Irène Jacob as Irène
 Fisher Stevens as Fish
 Daniela Dams as Iracema
 Jérôme Kircher as Robert
 Jean-Marc Roulot as Antoine
 Bob Nadkarni as Bob

References

External links
 
 

2010 films
French comedy films
2010s English-language films
2010s French-language films
2010 comedy films
Films set in Rio de Janeiro (city)
Films shot in Rio de Janeiro (city)
2010 multilingual films
2010s French films
English-language French films